Fabrício Nogueira Nascimento (born 1 October 1976 in Pereira Barreto) is a Brazilian footballer. He plays for SC Kriens.

He was known as Bill in Brazil and Piu in Switzerland. Although spending almost ten years in Switzerland, he never played in Swiss Super League.

External links
 CBF
football.ch

Brazilian footballers
Brazilian expatriate footballers
FC Baden players
SV Waldhof Mannheim players
FC Schaffhausen players
FC Luzern players
FC Wohlen players
SC Kriens players
FC Wangen bei Olten players
Expatriate footballers in Germany
Expatriate footballers in Switzerland
Association football forwards
Footballers from São Paulo (state)
1976 births
Living people